The Newport district was one of the five local government districts of Gwent from 1974 to 1996. The district comprised the county borough of Newport and several surrounding parishes. It inherited the borough status of the former authority and was therefore styled as the Borough of Newport.

The district was formed by the Local Government Act 1972, from the county borough of Newport, the Caerleon Urban District and Magor and St Mellons Rural District (except the parishes of Henllys and St Mellons) from the administrative county of Monmouthshire.

The district was abolished in 1996 by the Local Government (Wales) Act 1994, when it was reconstituted as the unitary authority county borough of Newport.

The right to use the armorial bearings of the Newport Corporation which were lost when the corporation was abolished on 1 April 1974 were only officially transferred to the new authority on 14 March 1996, some 18 days before it too was abolished. The present city council was awarded the right to use the arms on 26 July 1996.

References

History of Newport, Wales
Gwent (county)
Newport
1974 establishments in Wales